Elachista arenbergeri is a moth in the family Elachistidae. It was described by Traugott-Olsen in 1988. It is found in Tunisia.

References

Moths described in 1988
arenbergeri
Moths of Africa